John Henry Thorpe OBE KC (7 August 1887 – 31 October 1944) was a British Conservative politician.

Thorpe was the eldest son of the Venerable John Henry Thorpe, Archdeacon of Macclesfield.  He was educated at St John's School, Leatherhead and Trinity College, Oxford.

Thorpe trained as a barrister (later becoming Recorder of Blackburn) and entered the Commons in 1919 as MP for Manchester Rusholme. During his tenure, he married Ursula Norton-Griffiths (the eldest daughter of John Norton-Griffiths) on 19 December 1922, and their son was the Liberal MP (John) Jeremy Thorpe (1929–2014).

References

External links 
 

1887 births
1944 deaths
Conservative Party (UK) MPs for English constituencies
Officers of the Order of the British Empire
UK MPs 1918–1922
UK MPs 1922–1923
People educated at St John's School, Leatherhead
Alumni of Trinity College, Oxford